George Percy Churchill CBE FSA  (1877–1973) was a British historian and diplomat.

Early life
He was born in 1877 the son of Henry Adrian Churchill, an archaeological explorer and British diplomat. Three of his four brothers, Harry Lionel, Sidney John Alexander  William Algernon were also diplomats.

In 1906 he married Muriel East (d. 1968) with whom he had two sons.

Career
He was Oriental Secretary at the British Legation in Tehran from 1903.  He could read and write in the Persian language and translated The Constitution granted to Persia, 30 December 1906 and, at a date unknown, wrote Farhang-i rijāl-i Qājār

In 1906 he wrote Biographical Notices of Persian Statesmen and Notables comprising an index of prominent Qajar statesmen, a collection of notes, genealogical tables, and over 300 seal impressions. Copies are held at the India Office records at the British Library, the Foreign Office records at the National Archives, and in libraries at Bamberg, Cambridge and Canberra.

In 1919 he was employed by the Foreign Office and attached to the English Suite of the Shah of Persia during his Majesty's State visit to England in 1919, and was given the first class of the Order of the Lion and Sun.

In 1924 he was appointed British Consul-General in Algiers, a position to which his father had previously been posted in 1863. In 1927 he wrote A Historical Sketch of Algeria.

Bibliography
Biographical Notices of Persian Statesmen and Notables, George Percy Churchill, Government of India Foreign Department, 1906
The Constitution granted to Persia, December 30, 1906. Persian text and an English translation by G.P. Churchill. Teheran, 1906
Farhang-i rijāl-i Qājār, George Percy Churchill, Intishārāt-i Zarrīn, Iran. 
A Historical Sketch of Algeria, George Percy Churchill,  Imprimerie Algerienne,  1927

References

British diplomats
19th-century British historians
1877 births
1973 deaths
20th-century British historians